"Don't Steal Our Sun" is the fourth and final single released by Irish band the Thrills from their debut album, So Much for the City (2003). Released on 24 November 2003, the song reached number 45 on the UK Singles Chart and number 38 in Ireland.

Track listing

Charts

References

2003 singles
2003 songs
The Thrills songs
Virgin Records singles